Shaikh Isa Causeway (officially known as Shaikh Isa bin Salman Causeway) is a causeway in the Kingdom of Bahrain connecting Busaiteen to the Diplomatic Area, near the Bahrain Bay area.  Opened to the public in January 1997, it was constructed to relieve the congestion of the previous bridge connecting Muharraq Island to the mainland Bahrain Island. 

It is named after the deceased emir of Bahrain, Shaikh Isa bin Salman al-Khalifa.

Commemoration
A commemorative stamp was issued by the Bahrain Post Office in 1997 to commemorate the opening of the bridge.

References

Road bridges in Bahrain
Causeways